Benjamin Raich (born 28 February 1978 in Arzl im Pitztal, Tyrol) is an Austrian former World Cup champion alpine ski racer and Olympic gold medalist. With 14 medals won at Winter Olympics and World Championships, 36 World Cup race victories (in all disciplines except downhill), one first place and five second places in the World Cup overall ranking, three victories of the slalom World Cup, three victories of the combined World Cup, two victories of the giant slalom World Cup and the highest score of career World Cup points (ahead of Norwegian Kjetil André Aamodt), he is considered among the best alpine racers in World Cup history.

Career
After winning Junior World Championships in both slalom and giant slalom, Raich made his World Cup debut in March 1996. He scored his first victory in 1999, in slalom.

In 2001 he won the silver medal in slalom at the World Championships, and at the end of the season he won the slalom World Cup. In 2002 he won two bronze medals at the Salt Lake City Olympics.

Raich, who became better at faster specialities such as super-G and downhill with age also, in 2005 barely missed out on the overall World Cup title, placing second to American Bode Miller. At the 2005 World Championships he won a total of five medals, one for each race except for the downhill.

He won the 2006 World Cup overall title in the most successful season of his career, as well as Olympic gold medals in slalom and giant slalom at the Turin Olympics.

Throughout his career Raich has been known for his consistency which led to him to second places in the overall world cup in 2005, 2007, 2008, 2009 and 2010 (narrowly missing out the titles in both 2007 and 2009 by 13 points and 2 points respectively, both times behind Svindal).

His last World Cup race victory came in February 2012 in Swiss Crans Montana, where he won his first and only World Cup victory in super-G. In March 2014, he reached the podium for the first time in more than two years by finishing second (after Ted Ligety) in a giant slalom race in Kranjska Gora, the same place where he also won his first top-3 result more than 15 years earlier (in January 1999). His last top three finish came in early March 2015 in a giant slalom race in Garmisch-Partenkirchen that came to be one of his final races in the alpine world cup.

On September 10, 2015, he announced his retirement.

World Cup results

Season standings

Season titles
9 titles: 1 overall, 2 giant slalom, 3 slalom, 3 combined

Individual races
36 total: 14 slalom, 14 giant slalom, 1 super-G, 7 combined

World Championship results

Olympic results

Personal
His sister Carina Raich also is a ski racer. Benjamin Raich is married to skier Marlies Schild. They have three children together.

See also
Ski World Cup Most podiums & Top 10 results

External links
 
 Benjamin Raich World Cup standings at the International Ski Federation
 
 
 Atomic Skis – athletes – Benjamin Raich

1978 births
Austrian male alpine skiers
Alpine skiers at the 2002 Winter Olympics
Alpine skiers at the 2006 Winter Olympics
Alpine skiers at the 2010 Winter Olympics
Alpine skiers at the 2014 Winter Olympics
Olympic alpine skiers of Austria
Medalists at the 2002 Winter Olympics
Medalists at the 2006 Winter Olympics
Olympic medalists in alpine skiing
Olympic gold medalists for Austria
Olympic bronze medalists for Austria
FIS Alpine Ski World Cup champions
People from Imst District
Sportspeople from Tyrol (state)
Living people